In model checking, a field of computer science, a difference bound matrix (DBM) is a data structure used to represent some convex polytopes called zones. This structure can be used to efficiently implement some geometrical operations over zones, such as testing emptyness, inclusion, equality, and computing the intersection and the sum of two zones. It is, for example, used in the Uppaal model checker;  where it is also distributed as an independent library.

More precisely, there is a notion of canonical DBM; there is a one-to-one relation between canonical DBMs and zones and from each DBM a canonical equivalent DBM can be efficiently computed.  Thus, equality of zone can be tested by checking for equality of canonical DBMs.

Zone 
A difference bound matrix is used to represents some kind of convex polytopes. Those polytopes are called zone. They are now defined.

Zones have originally be called region, but nowadays this name usually denote region, a special kind of zone. Intuitively, a region can be considered as a minimal non-empty zones, in which the constants used in constraint are bounded.

However, an arbitrary convex polytope in  may require an arbitrarily great number of constraints. Even when , there can be an arbitrary great number of non-redundant constraints , for  some constants. This is the reason why DBMs can not be extended from zones to convex polytopes.

Example 
However some of those constraints are either contradictory or redundant. We now give such examples.
Hence, when two such constraints are found, the zone defined is empty. 
The second constraint being implied by the first one. Hence, when two such constraints are found in the definition of the zone, the second constraint may be removed. 

We also give example showing how to generate new constraints from existing constraints. If no such constraint can be found, the constraint  can be added to the zone definition without loss of generality. But in some case, a more precise constraint can be found. Such an example is now going to be given.
 the constraints ,  implies that .
 the constraints ,  implies that .
 the constraints ,  implies that .

Actually, the two first cases above are particular cases of the third cases. And thus, the constraint  added in the first example is similar to the constraint added in the third example.

Definition 
We now fix a monoid  which is a subset of the real line. This monoid is traditionally the set of integers,  rationals, reals, or their subset of non-negative numbers.

Constraints 
In order to define the data structure difference bound matrix, it is first required to give a data structure to encode atomic constraints. Furthermore, we introduce an algebra for atomic constraints. This algebra is similar to the tropical semiring, with two modifications:
 An arbitrary ordered monoid may be used instead of ℝ.
 In order to distinguish between "" and "", the set of elements of the algebra must contain information stating whether the order is strict or not.

Definition of constraints 
The set of satisfiable constraints is defined as the set of pairs of the form:
 , which represents the absence of constraint.

The set of constraint contains all satisfiable constraints and contains also the following unsatisfiable constraint:
 .

The subset  can not be defined using this kind of constraints. More generally, some convex polytopes can not be defined when the ordered monoid does not have the least-upper-bound property, even if each of the constraints in its definition uses at most two variables.

Operation on constraints 
In order to generate a single constraint from a pair of constraints applied to the same (pair of) variable, we formalize the notion of intersection of constraints and of order over constraints. Similarly, in order to define a new constraints from existing constraints, a notion of sum of constraint must also be defined.

Order on constraints 
We now define an order relation over constraints. This order symbolize the inclusion relation.

First, the set  is considered as an ordered set, with < being inferior to ≤. That is, the order on constraints is the lexicographical order applied from right to left. Note that this order is a total order. If  has the least-upper-bound property (or greatest-lower-bound property) then the set of constraints also have it.

Intersection of constraints 
If  has the greatest-lower bound property then the intersection of an infinite number of constraints is also defined.

Sum of constraints 

Constraints as an algebra 
Here is a list of algebraic properties satisfied by the set of constraints.
 Both operations are associative and commutative,
 Sum is distributive over intersection, that is, for any three constraints,  equals ,
 The intersection operation is idempotent,
 The constraint  is an identity for the intersection operation,
 The constraint  is an identity for the sum operation,

Furthermore, the following algebraic properties holds over satisfiable constraints:
 The constraint  is a zero for the sum operation,

Thus, the set of constraints does not even form a semiring, because the identity of the intersection is distinct from the zero of the sum.

DBMs  
Intuitively, for a column  and a row , the value  at position  represents .

Before introducing the definition of a canonical DBM, we need to define and discuss an order relation on those matrices.

Order on those matrices 
A matrix  is considered to be smaller than a matrix  if each of its entries are smaller. Note that this order is not total.

Note that since  is the «sum» operation of the semiring of constraints, the operation  is the «sum» of two DBMs where the set of DBMs is considered as a module.

Similarly to the case of constraints, considered in section "Operation on constraints" above, the greatest-lower-bound of an infinite number of matrices is correctly defined as soon as  satisfies the greatest-lower-bound property.

The intersection of matrices/zones is defined.  The union operation is not defined, and indeed, a union of zone is not a zone in general.

For an arbitrary set  of matrices which all defines the same zone ,  also defines . It thus follow that, as long as  has the greatest-lower-bound property, each zone which is defined by at least a matrix has a unique minimal matrix defining it.

First definition of canonical DBM 
We restate the definition of a canonical difference bound matrix. It is a DBM such that no smaller matrix defines the same set. It is explained below how to check whether a matrix is a DBM, and otherwise how to compute a DBM from an arbitrary matrix such that both matrices represents the same set. But first, we give some examples.

Examples of matrices 
We first consider the case where there is a single clock .

The real line 
We then introduce another DBM which encode the set . This allow to find constraints which must be satisfied by any DBM. 
    
In the remaining of the discussion, we will not explicitly describe constraints due to entries of the form , since those constraints are systematically satisfied.

The DBM  also encodes the set of real.

The empty set 
We now consider many matrices which all encodes the empty set. We first give the canonical DBM for the empty set. We then explain why each of the DBM encodes the empty set. This allow to find constraints which must be satisfied by any DBM.

Those constraints are unsatisfiable.

The DBM  also encodes the empty set. Indeed, it contains the constraint  which is unsatisfiable.

The DBM  also encodes the empty set. Indeed, it contains the constraint  which is unsatisfiable.

The DBM  also encodes the empty set.

The DBM  also encodes the empty set.

Strict constraints 
The examples given in this section are similar to the examples given in the Example section above. This time, they are given as DBM.

As mentioned in the Example section, both of those constraints implies that . It means that the DBM  encodes the same zone. Actually, it is the DBM of this zone. This shows that in any DBM , for each , the constraint  is smaller than the constraint .

As explained in the Example section, the constant 0 can be considered as any variable, which leads to the more general rule: in any DBM , for each , the constraint  is smaller than the constraint .

Three definition of canonical DBM 
Furthermore, it follows one of the following equivalent properties.
 there are no smaller DBM defining the same zone,
 for each , the constraint  is smaller than the constraint 
This graph is called the potential graph of the DBM.

The last definition can be directly used to compute the canonical DBM associated to a DBM. If this algorithm detects a cycle of negative length, this means that the constraints are not satisfiable, and thus that the zone is empty.

Operations on zones 
As stated in the introduction, the main interest of DBMs is that they allow to easily and efficiently implements operations on zones.

We first recall operations which were considered above:
 A DBM for the intersection of a set of zones is the greatest-lower-bound of the DBM of those zones,

We now describe operations which were not considered above. The first operations described below have clear geometrical meaning. The last ones become corresponds to operations which are more natural for clock valuations.

Sum  of zones 
Note that since  is the «product» operation of the semiring of constraints, the operation  over DBMs is not actually an operation of the  module of DBM.

Projection of a component to a fixed value 
Let  a constant.

Future and past of a zone 
Let us call the future the zone  and the past the zone .

The names future and past comes from the notion of clock.

The definition of the past of a zone is similar. However, there is even a simpler algorithm to apply to DBM.

See also 
 Region (model checking) – a zone, minimal under inclusion, satisfying some properties

References 

 Difference Bound Matrices Lecture #20 of Advanced Model Checking Joost-Pieter Katoen
 

Polytopes
Polytope
Geometric data structures